Route 2 was a previous number used for a major highway in the Canadian province of Quebec. The highway stretched from the Ontario border at Rivière-Beaudette to the New Brunswick border southeast of Dégelis. The highway was part of a de facto interprovincial Route 2 that stretched from Windsor, Ontario to Halifax, Nova Scotia, connecting Ontario Highway 2 to New Brunswick Route 2, and further to Nova Scotia, connecting with Trunk 2. It was renumbered in the mid-1970s, as part of Quebec's renumbering scheme.

Replacement routes 
Route 2 was replaced by the following routes:

Auxiliary routes 
Route 2 had three auxiliary routes.

Route 2A 

Route 2A was a  alternate route of Route 2, passing through the communities of Saint-Pacôme and Saint-Pascal. As part of Quebec's renumbering scheme, Route 2A became part of Route 230.

Route 2B 

Route 2B was a  spur of Route 2. It ran along Côte-de-Liesse Road from the former Route 2 / Route 17 concurrency in Dorval, past the Montreal–Dorval International Airport, to a traffic circle in Saint-Laurent where it met Laurentien Boulevard and Décarie Boulevard (Route 8 / Route 11A). The route was replaced by Autoroute 520 and its former eastern terminus is now the site of the Décarie Interchange.

Route 2C 

Route 2C was a  spur of Route 2 which ran along Boulevard Wilfrid-Hamel in Quebec City from Route 2 on the city's western edge to downtown. As part of Quebec's renumbering scheme, Route 2C became part of Route 138.

References

02